The Roman Catholic Diocese of San Fernando de Apure is a suffragan Latin diocese in the Ecclesiastical province of Calabozo in Venezuela.

Its cathedral episcopal see is, located in the city of San Fernando de Apure.

History 
 It was established on 7 June 1954 as Territorial Prelature of San Fernando de Apure, on territories split off from the Dioceses of Calabozo and San Cristóbal de Venezuela
 Promoted on 12 November 1974 as Diocese of San Fernando de Apure
 It lost territory on 3 December 2015 to establish (part of) the Diocese of Guasdualito

Episcopal ordinaries
(all Roman rite)

Territorial Prelates of San Fernando de Apure 
 Bishop-prelate Angel Adolfo Polachini Rodriguez (1966.11.30 – 1971.03.25), Titular Bishop of Rusticiana (1966.11.30 – 1971.03.25); later Bishop of Guanare (Venezuela) (1971.03.25 – retired 1994.04.16)
 Bishop-prelate Roberto Antonio Dávila Uzcátegui (1972.06.23 – 1974.11.12 see below), Titular Bishop of Aurusuliana (1972.06.23 – 1974.11.12)

Suffragan Bishops of San Fernando de Apure 
 Roberto Antonio Dávila Uzcátegui (see above 1974.11.12 – 1992.06.23); later Auxiliary Bishop of Caracas (Venezuela) (1992.06.23 – 2005.12.12 retired) & Titular Bishop of Arindela (1992.06.23 – ...)
''Apostolic Administrator (1992.05.27 – 1994.07.12) Ignacio Antonio Velasco García, S.D.B. while Titular Bishop of Utimmira (1989.10.23 – 1995.05.27) & Apostolic Vicar of Puerto Ayacucho (Venezuela) (1989.10.23 – 1995.05.27); later Metropolitan Archbishop of Caracas (Venezuela) (1995.05.27 – death 2003.07.06), created Cardinal-Priest of S. Maria Domenica Mazzarello (2001.02.21 [2001.05.24] – 2003.07.06)
 Mariano José Parra Sandoval (1994.07.12 – 2001.07.10); later Bishop of Ciudad Guayana (Venezuela) (2001.07.10 – 2016.10.25), Archbishop of Coro (2016.10.25 - ...)
 Víctor Manuel Pérez Rojas (2001.11.07 – 2016.07.15 retired); previously Titular Bishop of Tagaria (1998.05.09 – 2001.11.07) & Auxiliary Bishop of Calabozo (Venezuela) (1998.05.09 – 2001.11.07)
Alfredo Enrique Torres Rondón (2016.07.15 - ...); previously Titular Bishop of Sassura (2013.07.15 - 2016.07.15) & Auxiliary Bishop of Mérida (Venezuela) (2013.07.15 - 2016.07.15)

See also 
Roman Catholicism in Venezuela

References

External links 
 GCatholic.org, with incumbent biography links
 Catholic Hierarchy 

Roman Catholic dioceses in Venezuela
Roman Catholic Ecclesiastical Province of Calabozo
Christian organizations established in 1954
Roman Catholic dioceses and prelatures established in the 20th century
1954 establishments in Venezuela
San Fernando de Apure